Fire Music may refer to:

 Fire Music (Archie Shepp album), 1965
 Fire Music (Gallon Drunk album), 2002
 Fire Music (Danko Jones album), 2015
 Fire Music (film), a 2018 documentary film